A list of films produced in France in 1918.

See also
 1918 in France

External links
 French films of 1918 at the Internet Movie Database

1918
Lists of 1918 films by country or language
Films